The Lower Commerce Street Historic District is a  historic district in the old commercial district of Montgomery, Alabama.  It includes fifty-two contributing buildings.  It is roughly bounded by the Central of Georgia railroad tracks, North Lawrence Street, Madison Avenue, and Commerce Street.  Architectural styles in the district include the Italianate, Classical Revival, and Renaissance Revival.  It was placed on the National Register of Historic Places on March 29, 1979, the boundaries were subsequently increased on February 25, 1982, and January 15, 1987.

Gallery

References

National Register of Historic Places in Montgomery, Alabama
Historic districts in Montgomery, Alabama
Italianate architecture in Alabama
Neoclassical architecture in Alabama
Renaissance Revival architecture in Alabama
Historic districts on the National Register of Historic Places in Alabama